Treixedo is a village (census in 2001 counted 1,104 people) and a former civil parish in the municipality of Santa Comba Dão, Portugal. In 2013, the parish merged into the new parish Treixedo e Nagozela.

Treixedo is an old village (the first documented reference is in a Latin text of 974), surrounded by beautiful valleys and wooded hills.

References

External links 
Treixedo website
Some photos of Treixedo

Freguesias of Santa Comba Dão
Former parishes of Portugal
Villages in Portugal